Minna-Maria Erika Haapkylä (born 10 June 1973 in Helsinki) is a Finnish actress. She has won two Jussi Awards; one for the best actress in a supporting role for a 1999 Veikko Aaltonen film Rakkaudella Maire, and another in 2009 for the best actress in a leading role for Kuulustelu, directed by Jörn Donner. Haapkylä was married to actor Hannu-Pekka Björkman from 2002 to 2014. They have two sons. Since 2014, she has been in a relationship with actress Joanna Haartti.

Selected filmography

Suolaista ja makeaa (1995)
Rakkaudella Maire (1999)
Kuutamolla (2002)
Helmiä ja sikoja (2003)
Lapsia ja aikuisia (2004)
FC Venus (2005)
Charlie Says (2006)
The Serpent (2006)
Joulutarina (2007)
Raja 1918 (2007)
Erottamattomat (2008)
Kuulustelu (2009)
Sovinto (2010)
Armi elää! (2015)

References

External links

1973 births
Living people
Actresses from Helsinki
20th-century Finnish actresses
Finnish film actresses
21st-century Finnish actresses
LGBT actresses
Finnish LGBT actors